Caiazzo Cathedral (Basilica concattedrale di Maria Santissima Assunta e Santo Stefano Vescovo) is a Roman Catholic church in Caiazzo, province of Caserta, Italy, dedicated to the Virgin Mary and Saint Stephen the Bishop. It was previously the cathedral (episcopal seat) of the diocese of Caiazzo, until in 1986 it became a co-cathedral in the present Diocese of Alife-Caiazzo, which was formed in that year by merging the two older dioceses of Caiazzo and Alife. In 2013 it was declared a minor basilica.

History
The church is believed to be built on the site of a pagan Roman temple. The capitals of the earlier church building were taken from a Roman structure. The church has been much rebuilt over the centuries.

References

Churches in the province of Caserta
Roman Catholic cathedrals in Italy
Cathedrals in Campania
Basilica churches in Campania